The Singing Bee may refer to the game show franchise:

 The Singing Bee (American game show), the original US version
 The Singing Bee (Australian game show), the Australian version
 The Singing Bee (Philippine game show), Philippines version